Elena Epuran (born 15 November 1931) is a Romanian alpine skier. She competed in three events at the 1956 Winter Olympics.

References

External links
 

1931 births
Possibly living people
Romanian female alpine skiers
Olympic alpine skiers of Romania
Alpine skiers at the 1956 Winter Olympics
People from Predeal